Washington Township, officially the Township of Washington, is a township in Bergen County, New Jersey, United States. As of the 2020 United States census, the township's population was 9,285, an increase of 183 (+2.0%) of the 2010 census count of 9,102, reflecting an increase of 164 (+1.8%) from the 8,938 counted in the 2000 census.

History

The Lenape Native Americans first inhabited the township and many names throughout the general area were passed down from the Lenape. Pascack and Kinderkamack are just two of these names. However, after Dutch and other European settlers began arriving in the 16th and 17th centuries, the Lenape population was decimated. It is estimated that by 1750, 90% of the Lenape population in and around present-day New Jersey was killed by European settlement through war and European diseases.

Washington Township was created by an act of the New Jersey Legislature on April 13, 1840, from the territories between the Hackensack River and Saddle River that had been part of Harrington Township. The township was named for George Washington, one of more than ten communities statewide named for the first president. It is one of five municipalities in the state of New Jersey with the name "Washington Township". Another municipality, Washington Borough, is completely surrounded by Washington Township, Warren County.

Growth in the area exploded after the Civil War with the completion of the New Jersey and New York Railway through the Pascack Valley, as communities were established near the railroad's stations.

Orvil Township was created on January 1, 1886, from the western portion of The Township of Washington and the southern portion of Hohokus Township.

The Borough Act resulted in a flurry of new boroughs created from portions of the township in 1894 as the "Boroughitis" phenomenon swept through the Township of Washington, with Westwood (May 8, 1894), Park Ridge (May 14, 1894), Eastwood (part; created June 6, 1894, borough lasted until 1896), Montvale (part; created August 31, 1894) and Woodcliff (part; created August 31, 1894, name changed to Woodcliff Lake in 1910) formed among the 26 boroughs created that year in the county. Hillsdale Township (now a borough) was created on March 25, 1898. Etna Borough, which ultimately became Emerson, was formed on April 8, 1903. River Vale (part) was the last to leave when it was created on April 30, 1906.

Seven Chimneys is a house with the described seven chimneys, located on Ridgewood Road atop a small hill. George Washington is said to have stayed at the house during the Revolutionary War. Seven Chimneys, the oldest house in the township, is an impressive example of eighteenth-century, regional, domestic architecture and is an important remnant of the community's early settlement period. The house is listed on the State Register and National Register of Historic Places. Notable visitors include Theodore Roosevelt. The house was used as a stop on the Underground Railroad during the Civil War. On November 3, 1968, the Bergen County Historical Society placed a historic-site marker on the property and was placed on the National Register of Historic Places in 1971.

During the mid-1950s, the completion of the  Garden State Parkway split the township in two. The Parkway created two access routes with Exit 166 on the southern border closest to Paramus and Exit 168 on Washington Avenue. The northernmost toll plaza was built off of East Glen. During the decade after the Parkway was completed, the township dramatically increased in population.

Efforts to gain a ZIP Code for the township back to the mid-1970s, when efforts were made to have the unused 07676 code allocated to the Township of Washington. Previously, the township had been served by the Westwood post office as ZIP Code 07675, which also served Old Tappan, River Vale and Woodcliff Lake. ZIP Code 07676 for Township of Washington was established effective July 2000.

Geography
According to the United States Census Bureau, the township had a total area of 3.00 square miles (7.78 km2), including 2.95 square miles (7.65 km2) of land and 0.05 square miles (0.13 km2) of water (1.67%).

It is within the Hackensack River watershed, which comprises Musquapsink Brook, Schlegel Lake, Pascack Brook, Oradell Reservoir, Woodcliff Lake Reservoir, and Lake Tappan. The township borders the Bergen County municipalities of Emerson, Hillsdale, Ho-Ho-Kus, Paramus, Ridgewood, Saddle River and Westwood.

Three hills are in the township: at the border of Westwood, west of Pascack Road, and another located west of Van Emburgh Avenue. Being higher in elevation, it is slightly cooler and less prone to flooding than the rest of the valley and other parts of northwestern Bergen County.

The southern end of the township bordering Emerson and Paramus is wooded wetlands at the convergence of Musquapsink Brook and three cemeteries, and has consistently the densest overnight and morning fog in the area.

Demographics

2010 Census

The Census Bureau's 2006–2010 American Community Survey showed that (in 2010 inflation-adjusted dollars) median household income was $117,394 (with a margin of error of +/− $14,960) and the median family income was $133,191 (+/− $10,285). Males had a median income of $91,038 (+/− $11,435) versus $56,599 (+/− $4,609) for females. The per capita income for the township was $48,415 (+/− $4,855). About 1.6% of families and 2.0% of the population were below the poverty line, including 1.8% of those under age 18 and 0.6% of those age 65 or over.

Same-sex couples headed 27 households in 2010, an increase from the 10 counted in 2000.

2000 Census
As of the 2000 United States census there were 8,938 people, 3,219 households, and 2,687 families residing in the township. The population density was 3,071.1 people per square mile (1,185.9/km2). There were 3,245 housing units at an average density of 1,115.0 per square mile (430.6/km2). The racial makeup of the township was 92.07% White, 0.98% African American, 0.04% Native American, 5.57% Asian, 0.44% from other races, and 0.90% from two or more races. Hispanic or Latino of any race were 3.35% of the population.

There were 3,219 households, out of which 33.9% had children under the age of 18 living with them, 74.2% were married couples living together, 7.0% had a female householder with no husband present, and 16.5% were non-families. 14.5% of all households were made up of individuals, and 7.7% had someone living alone who was 65 years of age or older. The average household size was 2.77 and the average family size was 3.07.

In the township, the population was spread out, with 22.7% under the age of 18, 4.8% from 18 to 24, 27.7% from 25 to 44, 27.8% from 45 to 64, and 16.9% who were 65 years of age or older. The median age was 42 years. For every 100 females, there were 92.3 males. For every 100 females age 18 and over, there were 89.9 males.

The median income for a household in the township was $83,694, and the median income for a family was $88,017. Males had a median income of $67,090 versus $41,699 for females. The per capita income for the township was $39,248. About 1.5% of families and 2.4% of the population were below the poverty line, including 2.5% of those under age 18 and 3.0% of those age 65 or over.

Economy
Washington Town Center is a shopping mall located in the center of the township on Pascack Road. Stores include Rite Aid, PNC Bank, a Post Office and several restaurants and shops. It has a movie theater which offers a variety of theatrical films. It was formerly a Bowtie Cinemas chain, but the name branding was dropped in 2016 and became Washington Township Cinemas. The privately held Washington Town Center is the township's single largest taxpayer. Through a quirk in the town's tax code, the not-for-profit Washington Township Recreation Club remains the township's second-largest taxpayer.

Parks and recreation

The Township of Washington offers various sports activities—baseball, softball, football, cheerleading, and soccer—which are played at the numerous parks and fields throughout the town. Clark Field includes a little league baseball field with two large dugouts and electronic scoreboard, a basketball court, a playground, sandbox, and a concession stand. The playground has many slides, monkey bars, games, gliders, fire poles, regular swings, baby swings, and a tire swing. Memorial Field is in the major recreation site in the township and provides facilities for multiple uses: baseball, softball, soccer and youth football. Adjacent to the Washington Elementary School, it also includes a recreation building with concession stand and a covered picnic pavilion. Other fields include Sherry Field which is close to the border of Westwood and township and offers a baseball field with two playing areas. The other field is Gardener Field which is a baseball field and also a playground. Both of these fields include a concession stand.

As the township does not provide for any recreational pool service, the Washington Township Recreation Club (WTRC) fills this void.  Membership at the Washington Township Recreation Club, more commonly known as the 'swim club' or 'pool', is not limited to township residents and is open to any individual or family who wishes to join. In addition to the Olympic sized outdoor pool, the WTRC also offers a game room and picnic area. Additional recreational facilities include the Bergen County YJCC, offering fitness programs, indoor swimming and a variety of classes for all denominations. The town also has a privately owned Racquet and Health Club.

Schlegel Lake, once referred to as Schlegel's Pond and commonly referred to as Washington Lake, is a  artificial body of water privately owned and managed by the Washington Lake Association (WLA) since 1947, whose members have exclusive rights to use of the pond and surrounding property. WLA members may enjoy fishing, boating, picnicking, nature observation and other outdoor activities.

Government

Local government
The Township of Washington is governed within the Faulkner Act (formally known as the Optional Municipal Charter Law) under the Mayor-Council system of municipal government (Plan E), implemented based on the recommendations of a Charter Study Commission as of January 1, 1970. The township is one of 71 municipalities (of the 564) statewide that use this form of government. The governing body is comprised of a mayor and a five-member Township Council, all of whom are elected at-large on a partisan basis to four-year terms of office, as part of the November general election. Members of the Township Council are elected to serve four-year terms of office on a staggered basis, with three seats up for election together and the other two seats (along with the mayor) up for election two years later in odd-numbered years.

, the Mayor of the Township of Washington is Republican Peter Calamari, whose term of office ends December 31, 2021. Members of the Township Council are Council President Desserie Morgan (R, 2023), Council Vice President Dr. Steven Cascio (R, 2023), Stacey Feeney (R, 2023), Tom Sears (R, 2025) and Daisy Velez (R, 2025).

Federal, state and county representation
The Township of Washington is located in the 5th Congressional District and is part of New Jersey's 39th state legislative district.

Politics
As of March 2011, there were a total of 6,381 registered voters in the Township of Washington, of which 1,364 (21.4% vs. 31.7% countywide) were registered as Democrats, 2,412 (37.8% vs. 21.1%) were registered as Republicans and 2,601 (40.8% vs. 47.1%) were registered as Unaffiliated. There were 4 voters registered as Libertarians or Greens. Among the township's 2010 Census population, 70.1% (vs. 57.1% in Bergen County) were registered to vote, including 91.0% of those ages 18 and over (vs. 73.7% countywide).

In the 2016 presidential election, Republican Donald Trump received 3,036 votes (56.1% vs. 41.1% countywide), ahead of Democrat Hillary Clinton with 2,184 votes (40.3% vs. 54.2%) and other candidates with 196 votes (3.6% vs. 4.6%), among the 5,484 ballots cast by the township's 7,010 registered voters, for a turnout of 78.2% (vs. 72.5% in Bergen County). In the 2012 presidential election, Republican Mitt Romney received 2,883 votes (58.3% vs. 43.5% countywide), ahead of Democrat Barack Obama with 2,000 votes (40.5% vs. 54.8%) and other candidates with 33 votes (0.7% vs. 0.9%), among the 4,941 ballots cast by the township's 6,619 registered voters, for a turnout of 74.6% (vs. 70.4% in Bergen County). In the 2008 presidential election, Republican John McCain received 3,146 votes (58.1% vs. 44.5% countywide), ahead of Democrat Barack Obama with 2,159 votes (39.8% vs. 53.9%) and other candidates with 42 votes (0.8% vs. 0.8%), among the 5,418 ballots cast by the township's 6,735 registered voters, for a turnout of 80.4% (vs. 76.8% in Bergen County). In the 2004 presidential election, Republican George W. Bush received 3,207 votes (59.6% vs. 47.2% countywide), ahead of Democrat John Kerry with 2,137 votes (39.7% vs. 51.7%) and other candidates with 27 votes (0.5% vs. 0.7%), among the 5,379 ballots cast by the township's 6,582 registered voters, for a turnout of 81.7% (vs. 76.9% in the whole county).

In the 2013 gubernatorial election, Republican Chris Christie received 69.3% of the vote (2,079 cast), ahead of Democrat Barbara Buono with 29.6% (889 votes), and other candidates with 1.0% (31 votes), among the 3,067 ballots cast by the township's 6,527 registered voters (68 ballots were spoiled), for a turnout of 47.0%. In the 2009 gubernatorial election, Republican Chris Christie received 2,329 votes (56.7% vs. 45.8% countywide), ahead of Democrat Jon Corzine with 1,475 votes (35.9% vs. 48.0%), Independent Chris Daggett with 200 votes (4.9% vs. 4.7%) and other candidates with 20 votes (0.5% vs. 0.5%), among the 4,110 ballots cast by the township's 6,623 registered voters, yielding a 62.1% turnout (vs. 50.0% in the county).

Education

Public school students in kindergarten through twelfth grade attend the Westwood Regional School District, a comprehensive regional school district serving students from both the Township of Washington and Westwood Borough. The district is the county's only regional district serving grades K–12. As of the 2020–21 school year, the district, comprised of six schools, had an enrollment of 2,796 students and 256.8 classroom teachers (on an FTE basis), for a student–teacher ratio of 10.9:1. Schools in the district (with 2020–21 enrollment data from the National Center for Education Statistics) are 
Berkeley Avenue Elementary School with 289 students in grades K–5, 
Brookside Elementary School with 398 students in grades K–5, 
Jessie F. George Elementary School with 274 students in grades K–5, 
Washington Elementary School with 316 students in grades K–5, 
Westwood Regional Middle School with 640 students in grades 6–8 and 
Westwood Regional High School with 843 students in grades 9–12.

Public school students from the township, and all of Bergen County, are eligible to attend the secondary education programs offered by the Bergen County Technical Schools, which include the Bergen County Academies in Hackensack, and the Bergen Tech campus in Teterboro or Bergen Tech campus in Paramus. The district offers programs on a shared-time or full-time basis, with admission based on a selective application process and tuition covered by the student's home school district.

Immaculate Heart Academy is a parochial, college preparatory, all-girls Catholic high school located on Van Emburgh Avenue, operating under the auspices of the Roman Catholic Archdiocese of Newark. The school was founded in 1960 as the first all-girls school operated by the Newark Archdiocese.

Emergency services
The Washington Township Volunteer Fire Department was founded in 1934. The station is located at 656 Washington Avenue and is home to  Rescue 40, Tower Ladder 41, Engine 43, and Engine 44.

The Washington Township Volunteer Ambulance Corps was founded in 1957. The station is located at 354 Hudson Avenue and is home to Ambulance 4–6.

The Washington Township Police Department was founded in 1934. The station is located at 350 Hudson Avenue in the municipal complex.

Transportation

Roads and highways

Located within the New York metropolitan area's arterial network, the township is easily accessible by car. The Garden State Parkway serves the Township with exits 166 (south) and 168 (north). The Parkway's final tool booth, the Pascack toll, is located in the township. County Route 502 also travels through the township. Route 17 is accessible nearby.

Public transportation 
NJ Transit bus route 165 serves nearby Westwood with access to and from the Township of Washington to the Port Authority Bus Terminal in Midtown Manhattan and local service on the 752 route. Westwood train station can also be easily accessed from the township.

Rockland Coaches provides express service from Pascack Road and Washington Avenue via Garden State Parkway Exit 168, with weekday rush-hour service provided to the Port Authority Bus Terminal in Midtown Manhattan, heading to New York in the morning and returning to the township weekday evenings on routes 46, 47 and 49.

Entertainment
The Township of Washington has a movie theater in the Washington Township Shopping Center, with three viewing screens. It closed in 2016 as Bowtie Cinemas, but reopened shortly thereafter as an independent cinema.

Community
The Township of Washington has its own TV station, Washington Community Television (WCTV), run entirely by volunteers. The non-profit, community access group is funded by cable franchise fees and provides a 24/7 electronic bulletin board telecast over several cable systems in surrounding towns. WCTV provides live programming and coverage of high school sports, local events and activities on the Public, educational, and government access (PEG) cable TV channels as well as the Internet. Its volunteers have been honored for their efforts.  Town Meetings are broadcast live and are archived on the WCTVNJ YouTube pages.

The Township of Washington Public Library offers a collection of 48,325 volumes with a circulation of over 80,000 items per year. It is a member of the Bergen County Cooperative Library System. In addition to traditional materials, the library offers an online collection and specialty items not typically found in a library setting, including technology, housewares and hobby equipment. Friends of the Township of Washington Public Library is a small group of dedicated volunteers who strive to improve and enhance the library through donations and special events. Laura Rifkin is the current Library Director.

As the township does not provide residential trash pickup service, residents must pay for trash pickup services through a choice of two private garbage companies.

Notable people

People who were born in, residents of, or otherwise closely associated with the Township of Washington include:

 Beverly Bower (1925–2002), operatic soprano
 Carol Higgins Clark (born 1956), mystery writer
 Robert Dow (born 1945), fencer who competed in the team saber event at the 1972 Summer Olympics
 Thomas Fitzpatrick (1940–2009), pilot known for two intoxicated flights where he flew from New Jersey and landed on the streets of New York City
 Damon Harrison (born 1988), defensive tackle for the New York Giants
* Mary Higgins Clark (1927–2020), best-selling author of suspense novels
 Raymond E. Johns Jr. (born 1955), General, Commander Air Mobility Command, United States Air Force
 Pert Kelton (1907–1968), vaudeville, movie, radio and television actress, who originated the role of Alice Kramden in The Honeymooners with Jackie Gleason
 John Markert (1929–2011), politician who served as Mayor of the Township of Washington before being elected to the New Jersey General Assembly, where he served three terms representing the 39th Legislative District
 Miriam Moskowitz (1916–2018), schoolteacher who served two years in prison after being convicted for conspiracy as an atomic spy for the Soviet Union
 Jeffrey Nordling (born 1962), actor who has appeared in the series Dirt
 B. J. Raji (born 1986), former NFL nose tackle who played for the Green Bay Packers
 Corey Raji (born 1988), professional basketball player
 Bob Schroeder (born 1960), member of the New Jersey General Assembly and former councilmember in the Township of Washington, who was sentenced in 2017 to eight years in state prison for deception, misconduct and passing bad checks
 Vito Trause (1925–2019), World War II United States Army veteran and prisoner of war

References

Sources 

 Municipal Incorporations of the State of New Jersey (according to Counties) prepared by the Division of Local Government, Department of the Treasury (New Jersey); December 1, 1958
 Clayton, W. Woodford; and Nelson, William. History of Bergen and Passaic Counties, New Jersey, with Biographical Sketches of Many of its Pioneers and Prominent Men., Philadelphia: Everts and Peck, 1882.
 Harvey, Cornelius Burnham (ed.), Genealogical History of Hudson and Bergen Counties, New Jersey. New York: New Jersey Genealogical Publishing Co., 1900.
 Van Valen, James M. History of Bergen County, New Jersey. New York: New Jersey Publishing and Engraving Co., 1900.
 Westervelt, Frances A. (Frances Augusta), 1858–1942, History of Bergen County, New Jersey, 1630–1923, Lewis Historical Publishing Company, 1923.

External links

 Township of Washington website

 
1840 establishments in New Jersey
Faulkner Act (mayor–council)
Pascack Valley
Populated places established in 1840
Townships in Bergen County, New Jersey